Plasmaviridae is a family of bacteria-infecting viruses. Acholeplasma species serve as natural hosts. There is one genus in the family, Plasmavirus, which contains one species: Acholeplasma virus L2. All viruses known in this family have been isolated from species in the class Mollicutes.

This family is poorly studied and little is known about the diversity and biology of these viruses.

Taxonomy
The family has one genus, Plasmavirus, which has one recognized member: Acholeplasma virus L2.

There are five tentative members of Plasmavirus:
 Mycoplasmatales virus-laidlawii 1 (L1)
 Mycoplasmatales virus-laidlawii 2 (L2)
 Mycoplasmatales virus-laidlawii 3 (L3)
 Mycoplasmatales virus-laidlawii 51 (L51)
 Mycoplasmatales virus-laidlawii O1 (O1)

Genome
The genome is condensed, nonsegmented and consists of a single molecule of circular, supercoiled double-stranded DNA, 12 kilobase pairs in length. The genome has a rather high G-C content of ~32%. The genome has 14 open reading frames, and encodes at least 15 proteins, of which at least four are structural proteins embedded in the membrane.

Structure
Virions are quasi-spherical, slightly pleomorphic, enveloped and about 80 nm (range 50–125 nm) in diameter.

Life cycle
Viral replication is cytoplasmic. DNA-templated transcription is the method of transcription. The virus exits the host cell by budding. Acholeplasma species serve as the natural host.

Infection
A productive infectious cycle begins before a lysogenic cycle establishes the virus in the infected bacteria. After initial infection of the viral genome the virus may become latent within the host. Lysogeny involves integration into the host chromosome.

References

External links
 ICTV Report Plasmaviridae
 Viralzone: Plasmaviridae

 
Bacteriophages
Virus families